Gava may refer to:

Places 
 Gavà, a town in Catalonia, Spain
 Gávavencsellő, also known as Gava, a town in Hungary

 Iran
 Bala Gava Sara, a village in Chini Jan Rural District, Gilan Province
 Pain Gava Sara, a village in Chini Jan Rural District, Gilan Province
 Gava Sara-ye Olya, a village in Chini Jan Rural District, Gilan Province

 Kyrgyzstan
 Uzbek-Gava (or Kaba), a village in Jalal-Abad Region
 Kirgizgava, a village in Jalal-Abad Region

People
 Gava (surname)

Other uses
 Aamhi Jato Amuchya Gava, a Marathi language film directed by Kamlakar Torne in 1968
 Gáva-Holigrady culture, a late Bronze Age culture of Eastern Slovakia, Western Ukraine, Northwestern Romania and Hungary
 Guduf-Gava language (also known as Gudupe, Afkabiye), an Afro-Asiatic language spoken in Borno State, Nigeria
 Gavà Mines, also known as Can Tintorer Mines, a pre-historic (Neolithic) archaeological site in the municipality of Gavà, Spain

See also
 Cava (disambiguation)